Sporting Kilmore Football Club is an Irish association football club based in Northside Dublin. They currently play in Division 3 of the Amateur Football League. They play their home games in Saint Anne's Park in Clontarf, Dublin and train on their pitch at the Oscar Traynor Rd in Coolock.

History
The concept for the club was effectively created by Paul Hennigan and Mark Winters who are also manager and assistant manager respectively. The current squad were previously Kilmore Boys but disbanded to create Sporting Kilmore. In the pre-season of 2010-2011 season Kilmore secured the sponsorship of Kennedy International. Sporting have currently no major honors. The 2010-2011 season will be the first league appearance.

2010-2011
The 2010-2011 season is yet to commence. Sporting will play their first game of the new season on 22 August this year.

Current squad
The club's current squad is as follows:

Association football clubs established in 2010
Association football clubs in Dublin (city)
2010 establishments in Ireland